Musa Kola may refer to:
 Musa Kola, Miandorud
 Musa Kola, Simorgh